Aaron Jennings Puckett, better known by his stage name Lil Aaron (stylized as lil aaron), is an American rapper, singer and songwriter from Goshen, Indiana. Merging elements of pop punk and emo with hip hop and pop, he has released five solo EPs, as well as two EPs as a member of the alternative hip hop collective Boyfriendz. He has also written songs for artists such as Blackbear, Liam Payne, Hailee Steinfeld, Dev and Kiiara. He took part in the writing of Lizzo's 2019 album Cuz I Love You, which won a Grammy Award for Best Urban Contemporary Album.

Early life
Puckett grew up in Goshen, Indiana. As a child, his Christian parents didn't allow him to listen to secular music, however he eventually became a fan of secular punk rock and emo bands through websites such as MySpace and PureVolume, without his parents knowing. First he discovered groups likes Never Shout Never, Owl City and The Ready Set, before becoming a fan of bands like Hit the Lights and Boys Like Girls. Looking back in adulthood, he has stated "I’ve been emo my whole fucking life". In middle school and high school, he was the vocalist of a pop punk, that was influenced by Hit the Lights and Metro Station and saw Puckett using overt auto-tune. As he grew older, Puckett became increasingly interested in the independent hip hop scene that was coalescing on the internet. This led to him dropping out of high school and moving to Los Angeles.

Career
Puckett began his career as a songwriter, working with artists such as Travis Mills, DRAM, Icona Pop and Kiiara. However, he soon wished to perform the tracks he was writing himself, beginning a solo-career in 2016 with the "Damn" produced by Y2K. On April 10, he was featured on the Travis Mills song "Trouble". On June 23, he released the track Prolly featuring Ilovemakonnen. On September 22, he was featured on the Joy song "Birthday". For his debut EP Gloing Pain$, he enlisted the members of Polyphia to record the instrumentals. Puckett's music first began gaining attention in mid-2017, through songs "Hot Topic" and "Warped Tour" that made references to cornerstones of pop punk and emo culture, namely Hot Topic and Warped Tour, and through sampling bands like Paramore and Panic! at the Disco. In late 2017, Puckett formed the group Boyfriendz, with Smrtdeath and Lil Lotus. They released their debut self-titled EP in December 2017. The EP was recorded in a single night and was released within a week through SoundCloud. In 2017, Puckett was featured on the song "Faded" by Kim Petras. A music video was released for the track in January 2018.

He featured on Goody Grace's song "In The Light Of The Moon", which was a part of the Infinite EP, released March 22, 2018. On May 31, he released the EP Rock$tar Famou$. The recording process for the EP was split between Kauai, Hawaii and Hollywood, California. On May 11, the EP's track "Quit" featuring Travis Barker was released accompanied by a music video. On September 5, a music video was released for the EP's song "Anymore" featuring Kim Petras. On November 16 and 17, Puckett opened for Blink-182 during their concert at the Pearl Theater in Las Vegas. He featured on Brooke Candy's song "Nuts", which was released on November 16.

On December 7, 2018, he released a Christmas EP titled Worst Christmas Ever. On December 29, he released the song "Studded Gucci Belt", which samples "Shake It" by Metro Station was accompanied by a music video featuring clips from the videos for "Welcome To The Black Parade", "I'm Not Okay (I Promise)", "I Write Sins Not Tragedies", "Misery Business", "Adam's Song" and "the Anthem". On January 25, 2019, he released the EP Dark Matter. Puckett was featured on Kim Petras' song "Homework" which was released on February 7. On February 14, Boyfriendz released their second EP BFZ2. He featured on Big Baby Scumbag's song "Dale Earnhardt (remix)", from the album Big Baby Earnhardt released January 17, 2020. Puckett was featured on Big Freedia's song "GTFOMF", from the EP Louder released March 13. He was featured on the track by Plavtinum titled "Girls on the Internet", which was release March 20. He was featured on the songs "Lights Off" and "She Told me to the Kill Myself" by Smrtdeath, which were released on the album Somethjng's Wrong on November 13, 2020. On October 6, 2020, he released his EP 808 Rock. He was featured on the song "Michelle Pfeiffer" by Ethel Cain, which was released on Feb 11, 2021.

Musical style
Puckett's music had been categorised as emo rap and rap rock. It includes elements of pop punk, SoundCloud rap and pop. Alternative Press called his music "genre-defying".

He has cited influences including Panic! at the Disco, Blink-182, Brokencyde and Dot Dot Curve In an interview with Projectu.TV, he stated that his goal was to appeal to both "the kids who listened to A$AP, Cudi and Kanye and the kids who listened to Black Veil Brides, Blood On The Dance Floor, the Warped Tour kind of music". His music often merges trap instrumentals with autotuned and distorted vocals using melodies reminiscent of pop punk and emo. Complex writer Joe Price described his sound as "Travis Scott meets Green Day". Pitchfork writer Jayson Greene described it as "sampl[ing] Panic! At the Disco, alternately whining like Blink’s Tom DeLonge and warbling like, well, Chief Keef over 808 claps. It’s all mixed together and atomized, a fever dream of Adidas tracksuits and dreads and emo power ballads". Hypefresh.co described his music as "mixing pop-punk attitude with the new genre of autotuned rap".

His music was cited as an influence by Yungblud for his album Weird!.

Discography

Extended plays

Singles

As lead artist

As featured artist

With Boyfriendz

Songwriting credits

Filmography

References

21st-century American male singers
21st-century American singers
American hip hop musicians
American male rappers
Emo rap musicians
Pop punk musicians
Musicians from Indianapolis
Rap rock musicians
Living people
1994 births